Events in the year 1940 in the British Mandate of Palestine.

Incumbents
 High Commissioner – Sir Harold MacMichael
 Emir of Transjordan – Abdullah I bin al-Hussein
 Prime Minister of Transjordan – Tawfik Abu al-Huda

Events

 27 April – A friendly association football match between the national teams of Mandatory Palestine and Lebanon takes place at the Maccabiah Stadium in Tel Aviv; Mandatory Palestine beats Lebanon 5–1.
 June – The Zionist underground paramilitary group "Lehi" is established by Avraham Stern with the aim of forcibly evicting the British from Palestine.
 9 September – The Italian Air Force bombs Tel Aviv causing 137 deaths.
 25 November – The Patria, a French-built ocean liner, carrying approximately 1,800 Jewish refugees from Nazi-occupied Europe to Palestine, sinks in the Haifa harbour after a bomb carried covertly on board by the Haganah to explodes; 260 people are killed and another 172 injured. 
 12 December – The MV Salvador carrying some 327 Bulgarian Jewish refugees from Nazi-occupied Europe to Palestine, is wrecked in a violent storm in the Sea of Marmora, near Istanbul; 204 passengers including 66 children are drowned.

Notable births
 25 January – Avraham Lanir, Israeli fighter pilot, highest ranking Israeli Air Force pilot to fall into enemy hands (died 1973)
 25 January – Giora Leshem, Israeli poet and publisher (died 2011)
 26 February – Amos Kloner, Israeli archaeologist (died 2019)
 29 February – Uri Milstein, Israeli historian
 12 March – Eitan Haber, Israeli journalist
 26 March – Haim Oron, Israeli politician
 1 April – Amos Yaron, Israeli general
 19 April – Yaron Ezrahi, Israeli political theorist (died 2019)
 1 May – Elana Eden, Israeli actress
 10 May – Zeidan Atashi, Druze Israeli politician and diplomat
 29 May – Eliezer Shlomo Schick, Israeli Hasidic rabbi (died 2015)
 6 June – Asa Kasher, Israeli philosopher and linguist
 17 July – Faisal Husseini, Palestinian Arab politician and senior member of PLO (died 2001)
 1 August – Ram Loevy, Israeli television director and screenwriter
 4 August – Eliyahu Ben Haim, Israeli-American rabbi, prominent leader of the Sephardic Jewish community in New York City
15 August – Ze'ev Revach, comedian, movie actor, director
 24 August – Yaron London, Israeli media personality, journalist, actor and songwriter
 12 September – Amatzia Chen, Israeli general
 3 October – Tamar Gozansky, Israeli politician
 18 October – Uzi Even, Israeli scientist and politician, first openly gay member of the Knesset
 20 October – Iftach Spector, Israeli fighter pilot
 23 October – Fouad Twal, the Roman Catholic archbishop and Latin Patriarch of Jerusalem since June 2008
 24 October – Yossi Sarid, Israeli politician (died 2015)
 24 October – Dan Shilon, Israeli radio broadcaster, journalist, TV host and media personality
 18 November – Haim Harari, Israeli theoretical physicist; President of the Weizmann Institute of Science
 24 December – Shaul Amor, Israeli politician (died 2004)
 Full date unknown
 Amin al-Hindi, Palestinian Arab, intelligence chief of the Palestinian National Authority (died 2010)
 Laila Shawa, Palestinian Arab artist
 Motti Ashkenazi, Israeli war hero of the Yom Kippur War and protest leader

Notable deaths

 4 August – Ze'ev Jabotinsky (born 1880), Russian (Ukraine)-born Revisionist Zionist leader, author, orator, soldier, and founder of the Jewish Self-Defense Organization in Odessa
 29 December – Dov Hoz (born 1894), Russian (Belarus)-born Zionist leader, founding member of the Haganah, and aviation pioneer

References

 
Years in Mandatory Palestine
Mandatory Palestine in World War II